Rita María Esquivel Reyes (born 22 May 1946) is a Mexican politician affiliated with the National Action Party. She served as Senator of the LVIII and LIX Legislatures of the Mexican Congress representing Nayarit. She also served in the XXV Legislature of the Congress of Nayarit.

References

1946 births
Living people
Politicians from Tepic, Nayarit
Women members of the Senate of the Republic (Mexico)
Members of the Senate of the Republic (Mexico)
National Action Party (Mexico) politicians
20th-century Mexican politicians
20th-century Mexican women politicians
21st-century Mexican politicians
21st-century Mexican women politicians
Members of the Congress of Nayarit